"Lo Siento BB:/" (English: "I'm Sorry Baby") is a song by Puerto Rican record producer Tainy, Puerto Rican rapper Bad Bunny and Mexican singer Julieta Venegas. It was released on October 5, 2021, through Rimas Entertainment, along with its music video. The song charted at number 2 on the Billboards Hot Latin Songs chart and reached number 12 on the Billboard Global 200. It received nominations for Best Reggaeton Performance and Best Urban Song at the 23rd Annual Latin Grammy Awards, winning the first one.

Commercial performance
On the Billboard Global 200, the song charted at number 199 when in the Billboard Hot 100 the song peaked at number 100. Also, the track peaked at number 93, giving Venegas her first top 100 song in that chart since "Eres para mí" featuring Anita Tijoux.

Music video
On October 5, 2021, Tainy dropped the music video for "Lo Siento BB:/" which was directed by STILLZ, the longtime collaborator of Bad Bunny who also directs the music video of "Thats What I Want" by Lil Nas X.

Charts

Weekly charts

Year-end charts

Certifications

References

External links
 

2021 singles
2021 songs
Bad Bunny songs
Spanish-language songs
Tainy songs